Fani Taifa Willis (born October 27, 1971) is an American attorney. She is the district attorney of Fulton County, Georgia, which contains most of Atlanta. She is the first woman to hold the office of Fulton County district attorney.

Early life
Willis was born in Inglewood, California. Her father was a member of the Black Panthers and a criminal defense attorney.

Willis graduated from Howard University and Emory University School of Law. She spent 16 years as a prosecutor in the Fulton County district attorney's office. Her most prominent case was her prosecution of the Atlanta Public Schools cheating scandal. In 2018, she went into private practice. That year, she ran for a seat on the Fulton County Superior Court, and lost. In 2019, Willis was chief municipal judge for South Fulton, Georgia.

District attorney of Fulton County
In 2020, Willis was elected district attorney for Fulton County, defeating Paul Howard Jr., a six-term incumbent and her former boss.

2020 election influence investigation

On February 10, 2021, Willis launched a criminal investigation into Donald Trump's attempts to influence Georgia election officials—including the governor, the attorney general, and Secretary of State Brad Raffensperger via a telephone call—to "find" enough votes to override Joe Biden's win in that state and thus undo Biden's victory in the 2020 presidential election.

In January 2022, she requested a special grand jury to consider charges of election interference by Trump and his allies. In May, a 26-member special grand jury was given investigative authority and subpoena power and tasked with submitting a report to the judge and Willis on whether a crime was committed. 

Willis sent target letters to people she is investigating related to the fake electors plot. These include two Republican officials — State Senator Brandon Beach and David Shafer, chairman of the Georgia Republican Party — and the 16 people who falsely presented themselves as electors. She also sent a target letter to State Senator Burt Jones, but then a judge said she could not target Jones due to a conflict of interest.

After hearing from 75 witnesses—including former US Sen. Kelly Loeffler, former White House Counsel Pat Cipollone, and possibly Sidney Powell—the special grand jury completed its work and was dissolved on January 9, 2023. On February 16, following a judge's order, parts of the report were released. The judge did not permit the release of recommendations for possible charges, intending to preserve the "due process" for anyone who might be indicted later. Several days later, the foreperson of the grand jury hinted that the recommendations were not "some giant plot twist" and that no one would be "surprised".

A different grand jury has yet to decide on charges.

Atlanta gang indictments
In May 2022, Willis' office indicted Young Thug for 56 counts of gang-related crimes under Georgia's RICO statute and felony charges for possession of illicit firearms and drugs that were allegedly discovered after a search warrant was executed. The rapper has been held in Cobb County jail since his arrest.

Personal life
Willis and her husband divorced in 2005. They have two daughters together.

References

1971 births
Living people
District attorneys in Georgia (U.S. state)
African-American women lawyers
African-American lawyers
African-American women in politics
Howard University alumni
Emory University School of Law alumni
21st-century African-American people
21st-century African-American women
21st-century American women lawyers
21st-century American lawyers
Women in Georgia (U.S. state) politics